Norman McLeod may refer to:

Norman McLeod (minister) (1780–1866), Presbyterian minister from Scotland who led a settlement of Highlanders to Nova Scotia and New Zealand
Norman McLeod (Australian politician) (1816–1886), pastoralist and member of the Victorian Legislative Assembly
Norman Leslie McLeod (1892–1949), politician in Saskatchewan, Canada
Norman Z. McLeod (1898–1964), American film director, cartoonist and writer
Norm McLeod (soccer) (born 1938), former Canadian national soccer team player
Norm McLeod (Australian footballer) (1879–1913), Australian rules footballer
Norman McLeod (rugby union) (1856–1921), English rugby union international
Norman MacLeod (poet) (1906–1985), American poet and writer

See also
Norman Macleod (disambiguation)